Wahlenbergia glabra is a small herbaceous plant in the family Campanulaceae native to eastern Australia.

It blooms throughout the year producing white flowers.

The species is found in New South Wales and Queensland.

References

glabra
Flora of New South Wales
Flora of Queensland